William Roxborough "Red" Stuart (February 1, 1900 – March 7, 1978) was a Canadian ice hockey defenceman who played seven seasons in the National Hockey League for the Toronto St. Pats and Boston Bruins between 1920 and 1927. The rest of his career, which lasted from 1920 to 1933, was spent in different minor leagues. He won the Stanley Cup in 1922 with the St. Pats.

Playing career
Stuart played hockey in Amherst, Nova Scotia, before becoming a professional with the Toronto St. Pats for the 1920–21 season. Stuart played four seasons with the St. Pats, and started a fifth before being traded to the Boston Bruins in December 1924. Stuart played three seasons for the Bruins before being traded to Minneapolis of the AHA in 1927. Stuart would play three seasons with Minneapolis. Stuart was then traded to Seattle of the PCHL, where he played a year and then played for various clubs before finishing his career with Halifax in 1933–34.

Career statistics

Regular season and playoffs

References

External links

1900 births
1978 deaths
Boston Bruins players
Canadian ice hockey defencemen
Duluth Hornets players
Ice hockey people from New Brunswick
Minneapolis Millers (AHA) players
People from Sackville, New Brunswick
Seattle Eskimos players
Stanley Cup champions
Toronto St. Pats players